King Tide is the fifth studio album released by Australian rock band Weddings Parties Anything.  The album was released in October 1993 on the RooArt label and peaked at No. 20 on the ARIA Album Charts.

Billy Bragg provides the vocals with Mick Thomas on "Island of Humour". "Stalactites" marks the first occasion when all members collaborated on the writing of a WPA song and it refers to a well known Melbourne restaurant.

The first single from the album, "Monday's Experts", released in August 1993, peaked at No. 45 on the ARIA Singles Charts. The two subsequent singles, "The Rain in My Heart" (December 1993) and "Island of Humour" (January 1994) however failed to chart.

Track listing

Personnel
Credited to:

Weddings Parties Anything
 Peter Lawler - bass guitar, vocals
 Marcus Schintler - drums, vocals
 Mick Thomas - guitar, vocals
 Paul Thomas - guitar, vocals
 Mark Wallace - accordion, vocals
 Jen Anderson - strings

Additional musicians
 Billy Bragg - guitar, vocals
 Michael Barclay - vocals
 Anna Burley - vocals
 Hugh Newinson - saw
 Parkville Quartet - strings
 Students of St Joseph's School - vocals
 Barb Waters - vocals
 Stacey Wright - vocals

Charts

External links

References

1993 albums
Weddings Parties Anything albums